Villa Erba is a 19th-century villa in Cernobbio, on the western shore of Lake Como in northern Italy. Its location is not far from the Villa d'Este luxury hotel in Cernobbio.

The villa was built by Luigi Erba, brother of the prominent Italian businessman  (founder of the Erba pharmaceutical company), to express his grandiosity. After the death of Luigi Erba, the villa was inherited by his daughter Carla and was used by members of her family, including her son Luchino Visconti.

In 1986, the property was bought by a public consortium to use as an exposition and congress center.

In popular culture
In 2004, the building and grounds were used as a filming location for the movie Ocean's Twelve, serving as the villa of a gentleman thief named François Toulour.

In early 2005, American singer Gwen Stefani shot the music video for her 2005 single, Cool, on the villa's grounds. During the same year, a leg of Anastacia's Live at Last Tour was hosted in the villa's park.

References

Villas in Lombardy
Houses completed in the 19th century
Buildings and structures in the Province of Como
Cernobbio
19th-century architecture in Italy